Spirits of Rhythm were an American jazz string band. 

The ensemble's members had previously played under several other names (The Sepia Nephews, Ben Bernie's Nephews, The Five Cousins), and upon adding Teddy Bunn as guitarist in 1932, the group began calling itself Spirits of Rhythm. They occasionally recorded, and performed frequently on 52nd Street in New York City, as well as in Hollywood in the 1930s and early 1940s.

The group featured vocalists accompanied by string instruments, sometimes with other accompaniment such as homemade percussion instruments and harmonica. In addition to the ordinary varieties of string instruments, the Spirits of Rhythm also featured a tiple, an instrument similar to the ukulele, but with multiple strings on each course. The group's vocalists often sang in nonsense syllables or in scat, employing the singer's voice more like an instrument rather than as a vehicle for lyrics. With some personnel changes, the group kept performing until 1946.

Members
Douglas Daniels - tiple
Walter Daniels - tiple
Teddy Bunn - guitar 
Wellman Braud - bass
Wilson Myers - bass
Leo Watson - vocals, tiple
Virgil Scoggins - percussion
Red McKenzie - percussion

References
Footnotes

General references
[ Spirits of Rhythm] at AllMusic

American jazz ensembles